Wong is a supermarket chain in Peru. Known until 2005 as E. Wong, it was started as a small store in 1942 by Chinese Peruvians in a residential area of the Miraflores District in Lima. Today, Cencosud has 18 supermarkets Wong.

History and development

In 1942, Erasmo Wong, a Chinese-Peruvian, opened a small store at a corner in the Av. 2 de Mayo, in a residential area in San Isidro. Originally a family business, the store kept growing and in 1983, the first store of the present-day Wong supermarket chain was inaugurated. The next store to be opened was located in Ovalo Gutiérrez, in Miraflores. Some years later, stores in Santiago de Surco were also opened; and by 1995, Wong had five stores all around Lima.

Wong's growth was characterized by going against market trends, being more customer-service–oriented instead of the more usual self-service and investing during some of the Peruvian economy's hardest times.

Company information

Wong focuses on bringing customers product variety and a highly personalized service.

It is widely known that Wong treats its employees (and customers too) very well. For example, instead of calling them “workers”, they call them “collaborators”. Therefore, it has earned several awards for the excellence of its service.

The Gran Corso de Fiestas Patrias, a large parade held annually a few weeks before July 28, the day of Peruvian independence, is organized by Wong and attended by more than 100,000 persons. The parade is usually celebrated in Miraflores and ends with a fireworks display.

Buyout and market share

On December 16, 2007 it was announced that Wong was bought by the Chilean company Cencosud, the 100% of the assets from Wong were sold for an amount of 500 million dollars to the Chilean group, 200 in cash and 300 in stocks from the Chilean corporation.

This action, plus the fact that this very possibility was denied by Efraín Wong himself mere months earlier  was taken very negatively by the Peruvian populace; marking the beginning of a slow decline in Wong market share.

The 2008 Independence Day Parade was viewed by many as a fiasco since Wong no longer had the required "nationalism" to hold such an event, however, its attendance still overshadowed a copycat event by rival Supermercados Peruanos.

As of September 2008, Wong market share has decreased to less than 30% of the market (from a high of 44% two years earlier) and shows no signs of going back up. Adding this to the fact that prices in Wong — being slowly standardized to Cencosud's levels — have risen by 11% overall in the last year, shows an uncertain future for Peru's former king of supermarkets.

References

External links

 Official website 

Supermarkets of Peru
Retail companies established in 1942
1942 establishments in Peru
2007 mergers and acquisitions